Astaga.com is an Indonesian focused internet brand that was founded in 2000 as part of the Indonesian internet investment company Indonesia Online. The site offers local news content, a search engine, and e-commerce facilities. After investing US $7 million, it was sold to South African-based Media conglomerate, M-Web in 2001 for an undisclosed sum. It grew over the years and peaked in 2004 with over 300 employees and Indonesia wide presence. In late 2004 M-Web decided to exit Indonesia and sold the operating assets of Astaga.com and Kafegaul.com to a consortium of foreign and Indonesian investors. In 2012 Astaga.com was purchased by an international investment company run by Phil Rickard and Sandy Gunawan. As of late 2013 , Astaga.com was in beta launch.

References

External links

Website Developer Astagatech
Astaga.com WHOIS

Indonesian brands
Digital marketing companies
2000 establishments in Indonesia